The Alvar Aalto Medal was established in 1967 by the Museum of Finnish Architecture, the Finnish Association of Architects (SAFA), and the Finnish Architectural Society. The Medal has been awarded intermittently since 1967, when the medal was created in honour of Alvar Aalto.  The award is given in recognition of a significant contribution to creative architecture. The award was given earlier at the Alvar Aalto Symposium, held every three years in Jyväskylä, Aalto's hometown. Recently the ceremony has been organized on Aalto's birthday, February 3rd, today the Finnish national Day of Architecture. 

The Alvar Aalto medal is typically awarded every 3 years in association with 5 organisations: the Alvar Aalto Foundation, The Finnish Association of Architects (SAFA), the City of Helsinki, Foundation for the Museum of Finnish Architecture and Architecture Information Finland, and The Finnish Society of Architecture. The medal, said to be awarded to future star architects; avoiding both currently vogue and the most radical avant-garde work. The medal was last awarded in 2020 to Bijoy Jain of Studio Mumbai.

Recipients of the Alvar Aalto Medal

See also
 List of architecture prizes

References

Architecture awards
Awards established in 1967
Alvar Aalto